Venezuela is a federal presidential republic.  
The chief executive is the President of Venezuela who is both head of state and head of government. Executive power is exercised by the President. Legislative power is vested in the National Assembly of Venezuela. Supreme judicial power is exercised by the Supreme Tribunal of Justice.

Legislative power 
Legislation can be initiated by the executive branch, the legislative branch (either a committee of the National Assembly or three members of the latter), the judicial branch, the citizen branch (ombudsman, public prosecutor, and controller general) or a public petition signed by no fewer than 0.1% of registered voters.

The voting age is 18, and voting is compulsory.

Executive power 
The president is elected by a plurality vote with direct and universal suffrage for a six-year term. A president may be re-elected perpetually (only in consecutive terms) as of 15 February 2009. The president appoints the Vice President.

The president decides the size and composition of the cabinet and makes appointments to it with the involvement of the National Assembly.

Former ministries include the Venezuelan Ministry of Infrastructure, which became the "Ministry of Public Works and Housing" and was split into the Ministry of Transport and Communications and the Ministry of Housing & Habitat in June 2010. The Ministry of Popular Economy became the "Ministry of Communal Economy" in 2007, and was merged into the Ministry of Communes and Social Protection on 3 March 2009, along with the Ministry of Participation and Social Protection. In February 2010 the Ministry of Planning and Development was merged with the Ministry of Finance to form the Ministry of Planning and Finance.

Legislative branch
The National Assembly has 165 seats. Members are elected by popular vote to serve five-year terms. Each member may be re-elected for a maximum of ten additional terms. Three Assembly seats are by law reserved for the indigenous peoples of Venezuela. National Assembly elections were last held on 6 December 2015.
When the National Assembly is not in session, its delegated committee acts on matters relating to the executive and in oversight functions.
At various times throughout its history, Venezuela has had unicameral and bicameral legislative bodies.

 Venezuelan Congress, first one convened in 1811, replaced by the legislature of Gran Colombia
 Assembly organized by Simon Bolivar, convened once to ratify a decision
 Legislature of Gran Colombia
 Unicameral Congress of Venezuela first convened under the 1830 constitution
 Transitional Congress, convened mainly for the purpose of writing a new constitution
 Bicameral Congress, consisting of a Senate (the formerly unicameral Congress) and the Chamber of Deputies
 Unicameral National Assembly of 1999
 Transitional legislative committee
 Unicameral National Assembly, the current legislative body

Judicial branch
The judicial branch is headed by the Supreme Tribunal of Justice, which may meet either in specialized chambers (of which there are six) or in plenary session. The 32 justices are appointed by the National Assembly and serve 12-year terms. The judicial branch also consists of lower courts, including district courts, municipal courts, and courts of the first instance.

Citizens branch
The citizens branch consists of three components the prosecutor general ("fiscal general"), the "defender of the people" or ombudsman, and the comptroller general. These officials of state, in addition to fulfilling their specific functions, also act collectively as the "Republican Moral Council" to submit to the Supreme Tribunal actions they believe are illegal, particularly those which violate the Constitution. The holders of the "citizen power" offices are appointed for seven-year terms by the National Assembly.

Electoral council
The National Electoral Council is responsible for organizing elections at all levels. Its members are elected to seven-year terms by the National Assembly.

See also
 Politics of Venezuela

Notes

External links